Global Internet Usage is the number of people who use the Internet worldwide.

Internet users

In 2015, the International Telecommunication Union estimated about 3.2 billion people, or almost half of the world's population, would be online by the end of the year. Of them, about 2 billion would be from developing countries, including 89 million from least developed countries. According to Hootsuite, the number of Global Internet users has already reached almost 5 billion, or about 53% of the global population as of 2021. The flat world of information has been created thanks to the Internet and globalization. This phenomenon allows individuals to have access to various cultural and ideological beliefs without having to go to other countries, resulting in immobile acculturation.

Broadband usage

Internet hosts

The Internet Systems Consortium provides account for the number of the worldwide number of IPv4 hosts (see below). On 2019 this internet domain survey was discontinued as it does not account of IPv6 hosts, and therefore might be misleading.

Web index

The Web index is a composite statistic designed and produced by the World Wide Web Foundation. It provides a multi-dimensional measure of the World Wide Web’s contribution to development and human rights globally.  It covers 86 countries as of 2014, the latest year for which the index has been compiled. It incorporates indicators that assess the areas of universal access, freedom and openness, relevant content, and empowerment, which indicate economic, social, and political impacts of the Web.

IPv4 addresses

The Carna Botnet was a botnet of 420,000 devices created by hackers to measure the extent of the Internet in what the creators called the "Internet Census of 2012".

Languages

Censorship and surveillance

See also
 A4AI: affordability threshold
 Digital rights
 Internet access
 Internet traffic
 List of countries by Internet connection speeds
 List of countries by number of mobile phones in use
 List of social networking services
 Zettabyte Era

References

External links
 "ICT Data and Statistics", International Telecommunication Union (ITU).
 Internet Live Stats, Real Time Statistics Project.
 Internet World Stats: Usage and Population Statistics, Miniwatts Marketing Group.
 "40 maps that explain the internet", Timothy B. Lee, Vox Media, 2 June 2014. 
 "Information Geographies", Oxford Internet Institute.
 "Internet Monitor", a research project of the Berkman Center for Internet & Society at Harvard University to evaluate, describe, and summarize the means, mechanisms, and extent of Internet access, content controls and activity around the world.

Internet
 
Digital divide
International telecommunications
World